Nichollsemys is a genus of extinct sea turtles. The only known species is Nichollsemys baieri.

Taxonomy 
 
Fossils of the Nichollsemys have been found in Alberta, Canada, by Donald Brinkman. The fossils found are all skulls.

The name of Nichollsemys is a tribute to Elizabeth Nicholls, a paleontologist from Canada who studied marine reptiles from the Triassic period. She had previously done work with Brinkman when they found the ichthyosaur genus Pattinatator.

Evolution

Description 

The full length of the Nichollsemys is unknown, but Brinkman made a chart of the length of some parts of the specimen. The length from the basioccipital to the premaxilla measures 11.4 cm, the width of all the quadrates measures 9.8 cm, the depth at level of the quadrates measures 7.1 cm, the intraorbital width measures 2 cm, and the length measures 3.6 cm.  The cranium has many things in common with that of Toxochelys: for example, they both have a rostrum basisphenoidale shaped like a rod.

References 

Prehistoric turtle genera
Prehistoric turtles of North America
Chelonioidea